Robert Hotchkyn was the Attorney General of Jamaica in 1703. His brother was the reverend John Hotchkin, rector of Abbotts Ripton, Huntingdonshire, owner of the Upper and Lower Ground estates in Jamaica and absentee slave-owner.

References 

Attorneys General of the Colony of Jamaica
Year of birth missing
Year of death missing
17th-century Jamaican people
18th-century Jamaican people